Nina Vasilyevna Savina (29 September 1915 – 1965) was a Soviet sprint canoer who won a bronze medal in the K-1 500 m event at the 1952 Summer Olympics. Savina won 18 Soviet titles in various rowing events. She held a PhD in pedagogy.

References

1915 births
1965 deaths
Canoeists at the 1952 Summer Olympics
Olympic canoeists of the Soviet Union
Olympic bronze medalists for the Soviet Union
Soviet female canoeists
Olympic medalists in canoeing
Russian female canoeists

Medalists at the 1952 Summer Olympics